Maurice Bladel (12 February 1886 – 14 February 1968) was a Belgian writer. He won a bronze medal at the 1920 Summer Olympics in the mixed literature section of the art competitions.

References

1886 births
1968 deaths
20th-century Belgian writers
Olympic bronze medalists in art competitions
Olympic bronze medalists for Belgium
Medalists at the 1920 Summer Olympics
20th-century Belgian male writers
Olympic competitors in art competitions
Art competitors at the 1920 Summer Olympics